Clostridium huakuii is a Gram-positive, acetogenic, obligately anaerobic and spore-forming bacterium from the genus Clostridium.

References

 

Bacteria described in 2014
huakuii